Equality of Treatment (Accident Compensation) Convention, 1925 is  an International Labour Organization Convention.

It was established in 1925:
Having decided upon the adoption of certain proposals with regard to the equality of treatment for national and foreign workers as regards workmen's compensation for accidents,...

Ratifications
As of 2013, the convention has been ratified by 121 states.

External links 
Text.
Ratifications.

Anti-discrimination treaties
Equality
Treaties concluded in 1925
Treaties entered into force in 1926
Treaties of Algeria
Treaties of the People's Republic of Angola
Treaties of Antigua and Barbuda
Treaties of Argentina
Treaties of Australia
Treaties of the First Austrian Republic
Treaties of the Bahamas
Treaties of Bangladesh
Treaties of Barbados
Treaties of Belgium
Treaties of Belize
Treaties of Bolivia
Treaties of Bosnia and Herzegovina
Treaties of Botswana
Treaties of the Second Brazilian Republic
Treaties of the Kingdom of Bulgaria
Treaties of Burkina Faso
Treaties of Myanmar
Treaties of Burundi
Treaties of Cameroon
Treaties of Cape Verde
Treaties of the Central African Republic
Treaties of Chile
Treaties of the Republic of China (1912–1949)
Treaties of Colombia
Treaties of the Comoros
Treaties of the Republic of the Congo (Léopoldville)
Treaties of Ivory Coast
Treaties of Croatia
Treaties of Cuba
Treaties of Cyprus
Treaties of the Czech Republic
Treaties of Czechoslovakia
Treaties of Denmark
Treaties of Djibouti
Treaties of Dominica
Treaties of the Dominican Republic
Treaties of the Kingdom of Egypt
Treaties of Eritrea
Treaties of Estonia
Treaties of Fiji
Treaties of Finland
Treaties of the French Third Republic
Treaties of Gabon
Treaties of the Weimar Republic
Treaties of Ghana
Treaties of the Kingdom of Greece
Treaties of Grenada
Treaties of Guatemala
Treaties of Guinea-Bissau
Treaties of Guyana
Treaties of Haiti
Treaties of the Kingdom of Hungary (1920–1946)
Treaties of British India
Treaties of Indonesia
Treaties of Pahlavi Iran
Treaties of the Kingdom of Iraq
Treaties of the Irish Free State
Treaties of Israel
Treaties of the Kingdom of Italy (1861–1946)
Treaties of Jamaica
Treaties of the Empire of Japan
Treaties of Kenya
Treaties of South Korea
Treaties of Latvia
Treaties of Lebanon
Treaties of Lesotho
Treaties of Lithuania
Treaties of Luxembourg
Treaties of North Macedonia
Treaties of Madagascar
Treaties of Malawi
Treaties of Mali
Treaties of Malta
Treaties of Mauritania
Treaties of Mauritius
Treaties of Mexico
Treaties of Montenegro
Treaties of Morocco
Treaties of the Netherlands
Treaties of Nicaragua
Treaties of Nigeria
Treaties of Norway
Treaties of the Dominion of Pakistan
Treaties of Panama
Treaties of Papua New Guinea
Treaties of Peru
Treaties of the Philippines
Treaties of the Second Polish Republic
Treaties of the Ditadura Nacional
Treaties of Rwanda
Treaties of Saint Lucia
Treaties of Saint Vincent and the Grenadines
Treaties of Samoa
Treaties of São Tomé and Príncipe
Treaties of Senegal
Treaties of Serbia and Montenegro
Treaties of Sierra Leone
Treaties of Singapore
Treaties of Slovakia
Treaties of Slovenia
Treaties of the Solomon Islands
Treaties of the Somali Republic
Treaties of the Union of South Africa
Treaties of Spain under the Restoration
Treaties of the Republic of the Sudan (1956–1969)
Treaties of Suriname
Treaties of Eswatini
Treaties of Sweden
Treaties of Switzerland
Treaties of the United Arab Republic
Treaties of Tanganyika
Treaties of Thailand
Treaties of Trinidad and Tobago
Treaties of Tunisia
Treaties of Uganda
Treaties of the United Kingdom
Treaties of Uruguay
Treaties of Venezuela
Treaties of the Yemen Arab Republic
Treaties of Yugoslavia
Treaties of Zambia
Treaties of Zimbabwe
Treaties of the Federation of Malaya
Treaties extended to the Nauru Trust Territory
Treaties extended to the Territory of Papua and New Guinea
Treaties extended to the Belgian Congo
Treaties extended to Ruanda-Urundi
Treaties extended to the Faroe Islands
Treaties extended to Greenland
Treaties extended to French Comoros
Treaties extended to French Somaliland
Treaties extended to French Polynesia
Treaties extended to New Caledonia
Politics of Saint Pierre and Miquelon
Treaties extended to the Trust Territory of Somalia
Treaties extended to Saint Christopher-Nevis-Anguilla
Treaties extended to British Antigua and Barbuda
Treaties extended to British Honduras
Treaties extended to Bermuda
Treaties extended to the British Indian Ocean Territory
Treaties extended to the British Virgin Islands
Treaties extended to Brunei (protectorate)
Treaties extended to the Cayman Islands
Treaties extended to British Dominica
Treaties extended to the Falkland Islands
Treaties extended to the Gold Coast (British colony)
Treaties extended to Gibraltar
Treaties extended to Guernsey
Treaties extended to Jersey
Treaties extended to the Gilbert and Ellice Islands
Treaties extended to the Isle of Man
Treaties extended to Montserrat
Treaties extended to the Pitcairn Islands
Treaties extended to Saint Helena, Ascension and Tristan da Cunha
Treaties extended to British Saint Lucia
Treaties extended to British Saint Vincent and the Grenadines
Treaties extended to the British Solomon Islands
Treaties extended to South Georgia and the South Sandwich Islands
Treaties extended to Southern Rhodesia
Occupational safety and health treaties
1925 in labor relations